Edzo Hendrik Toxopeus (19 February 191823 August 2009) was a Dutch politician and diplomat of the People's Party for Freedom and Democracy (VVD) and jurist.

Toxopeus studied Law at the Utrecht University obtaining a Master of Laws degree. Toxopeus worked as a paralegal in Breda from July 1942 until October 1944 and worked as a military lawyer in the Royal Netherlands Army from November 1944 until August 1945. Toxopeus worked as a criminal defense lawyer in Breda from August 1945 until May 1959. Toxopeus became as a Member of the House of Representatives shortly after the election of 1956 when the number of seats was increased from 100 to 150 on 6 November 1956 and served as a frontbencher and spokesperson for Law Enforcement and Spatial Planning.

After the election of 1959 Toxopeus was appointed as Minister of the Interior in the Cabinet De Quay taking office on 19 May 1959. Shortly before an upcoming election Party Leader and Parliamentary leader Pieter Oud announced his retirement and Toxopeus announced his candidacy to succeed him and was selected as his successor on 30 March 1963. For the election of 1963 Toxopeus served as Lijsttrekker (top candidate) and following a cabinet formation the coalition continued and Toxopeus retained his position in the Cabinet Marijnen. The Cabinet Marijnen fell just 19 months into its term and was replaced by the Cabinet Cals on 14 April 1965. Toxopeus returned to the House of Representatives on 21 September 1965 but against custom didn't take over as Parliamentary leader immediately and instead served as a frontbencher chairing the House Committee on the Interior and served as deputy parliamentary leader and spokesperson for General Affairs before taking over as Parliamentary leader on 12 March 1966. Toxopeus also served as President of the Liberal International from 15 April 1966 until 25 April 1970. For the election of 1967 Toxopeus again Lijsttrekker and following a successful cabinet formation with the Catholics formed the Cabinet De Jong with Toxopeus opting to remain as Parliamentary leader. On 1 October 1969 Toxopeus unexpectedly announced he was stepping down as Leader but continued to serve in the House of Representatives as a backbencher until his resignation on 1 November 1969.
 
Toxopeus continued to be active in politics and in January 1970 was nominated as the next Queen's Commissioner of Groningen serving from 16 February 1970 until 1 November 1980. Toxopeus also became active in the private and public sectors as a corporate and non-profit director and served on several state commissions and councils on behalf of the government. In October 1970 Toxopeus was nominated as a Member of the Council of State serving from 1 November 1980 until 1 March 1988. Toxopeus retired from active politics at 70 but continued to be active as an advocate and lobbyist for more European integration and served as an occasional diplomat for economic and diplomatic delegations for the European Union. Toxopeus was known for his abilities as a skillful manager and effective negotiator. Toxopeus granted the honorary title of Minister of State on 22 January 1985 and continued to comment on political affairs as a statesman until his death in August 2009 at the age of 91.

Early life
After earning his diploma in Breda he studied at the Utrecht University. He gained the master's degree in 1942. From 1942-1959 he was an established lawyer in Breda. From October 1944 to August 1945 he was head of the legal department of the military commission at Breda. From 1949-1959 he served as VVD member on Breda's municipal council. From 1956-1959 he was a Member of the House of Representatives.

Politics
As Minister of the Interior Toxopeus introduced several major reforms to the civil service, including major increase to salaries, improvements to employment conditions and the free Saturday was implemented in 1961.

From 1970-1980 he was Queen's Commissioner of Groningen. Until 1988 he was a member of the Dutch Council of State.

Following the formation of the Cabinet Van Agt-Wiegel Toxopeus was asked to become Minister of Finance but he refused.

Death
Toxopeus died on 23 August 2009, at age 91.

Decorations

References

External links

Official
  Mr. E.H. (Edzo) Toxopeus Parlement & Politiek

 

1918 births
2009 deaths
Commanders of the Order of the Netherlands Lion
Criminal defense lawyers
Dutch corporate directors
Dutch humanitarians
Dutch human rights activists
Dutch lobbyists
Dutch Mennonites
Dutch nonprofit directors
Dutch nonprofit executives
Dutch political activists
Former Lutherans
Grand Crosses of the Order of Merit (Portugal)
Grand Crosses of the Order of the Crown (Belgium)
Grand Crosses with Star and Sash of the Order of Merit of the Federal Republic of Germany
Grand Officiers of the Légion d'honneur
Grand Officers of the Order of Orange-Nassau
King's and Queen's Commissioners of Groningen
Leaders of the People's Party for Freedom and Democracy
Members of the Council of State (Netherlands)
Members of the House of Representatives (Netherlands)
Ministers of State (Netherlands)
Ministers of the Interior of the Netherlands
Municipal councillors of Breda
People's Party for Freedom and Democracy politicians
Presidents of the Liberal International
People from Amersfoort
People from Breda
People from Oegstgeest
Royal Netherlands Army officers
Royal Netherlands Army personnel of World War II
20th-century Dutch businesspeople
20th-century Dutch diplomats
20th-century Dutch jurists
20th-century Dutch lawyers
20th-century Dutch politicians